Thomas McKean (pronounced mc-CANE) (March 19, 1734June 24, 1817) was an American lawyer, politician, and Founding Father. During the American Revolution, he was a Delaware delegate to the Continental Congress, where he signed the Continental Association, the United States Declaration of Independence, and the Articles of Confederation. McKean served as a President of Congress. He was at various times a member of the Federalist and the Democratic-Republican parties. McKean served as president of Delaware, chief justice of Pennsylvania, and the second governor of Pennsylvania. He also held numerous other public offices.

Early life and education

McKean was born on March 19, 1734, in New London Township in the Province of Pennsylvania to William McKean and Letitia Finney. His father was a tavern keeper and both his parents were Irish-born Protestants who came to Pennsylvania as children from Ballymoney, County Antrim, Ireland. He was educated by Reverend Francis Alison at his school in New Castle, Delaware.

Mary Borden was his first wife. They married in 1763 and lived at 22 The Strand in New Castle, Delaware. They had six children: Joseph, Robert, Elizabeth, Letitia, Mary, and Mary. Mary Borden McKean died in 1773 and is buried at Immanuel Episcopal Church in New Castle. Letitia McKean married Dr. George Buchanan and was the mother of Admiral Franklin Buchanan.

Sarah Armitage was McKean's second wife. They married in 1774, lived at the northeast corner of Third and Pine Streets in Philadelphia, Pennsylvania, and had four children, Sarah, Thomas, Sophia, and Maria. They were members of the New Castle Presbyterian Church and the First Presbyterian Church in Philadelphia. McKean's daughter Sarah married the Spanish diplomat Carlos Martínez de Irujo, 1st Marquis of Casa Irujo; their son, Carlos Martínez de Irujo y McKean, as his father, would later become prime minister of Spain.

Career
In 1755, he was admitted to the bar of the Lower Counties, as Delaware was then known, and likewise in the Province of Pennsylvania the following year. In 1756, he was appointed deputy attorney general for Sussex County. From the 1762–1763 session to the 1775–1776 session, he was a member of the General Assembly of the Lower Counties, serving as its speaker in 1772–1773. From July 1765, he also served as a judge of the Court of Common Pleas and began service as the customs collector at New Castle in 1771. In November 1765, his Court of Common Pleas became the first such court in the colonies to establish a rule for all the proceedings of the court to be recorded on unstamped paper. In 1768, McKean was elected to the revived American Philosophical Society.

Eighteenth-century Delaware was politically divided into loose political factions known as the "Court Party" and the "Country Party". The majority Court Party was generally Anglican, was strongest in Kent and Sussex counties, worked well with the colonial Proprietary government, and supported reconciliation with the British government. The minority Country Party was largely Irish Presbyterian (also referred to as "Scotch-Irish" in America), was centered in New Castle County, and quickly advocated independence from the British. The revolutionary slogan "no taxation without representation" had originated in the north of Ireland under the British Penal Laws, which denied Presbyterians and Catholics the right to vote for members of the parliament. McKean was the epitome of the Country Party politician and was, as much as anyone else, its leader. As such, he generally worked in partnership with Caesar Rodney from Kent County and in opposition to his friend and neighbor, George Read.

At the Stamp Act Congress of 1765, McKean and Caesar Rodney represented Delaware. McKean proposed the voting procedure that the Continental Congress later adopted: each colony, regardless of size or population, would have one vote. That decision set the precedent, the Congress of the Articles of Confederation adopted the practice, and the principle of state equality has continued in the composition of the United States Senate.

McKean quickly became one of the most influential members of the Stamp Act Congress. He was on the committee that drew the memorial to parliament and, with John Rutledge and Philip Livingston, revised its proceedings. On the last day of its session, when the business session ended, Timothy Ruggles, the president of the body, and a few other more cautious members refused to sign the memorial of rights and grievances. McKean arose and addressing the chair insisted that the president give his reasons for his refusal. After refusing at first, Ruggles remarked that "it was against his conscience." McKean then disputed his use of the word "conscience" so loudly and so long that a challenge was given by Ruggles and accepted in the presence of the Congress. However, Ruggles left the next morning at daybreak, and so the duel did not take place.

American Revolution

In spite of his primary residence in Philadelphia, McKean remained the effective leader for American independence in Delaware. Along with Read and Caesar Rodney, he was one of Delaware's delegates to the First Continental Congress in 1774 and the Second Continental Congress in 1775 and 1776.

Being an outspoken advocate of independence, McKean was a key voice in persuading others to vote for a split with Great Britain. When Congress began debating a resolution of independence in June 1776, Rodney was absent. Read was against independence, which meant that the Delaware delegation was split between McKean and Read and therefore could not vote in favor of independence. McKean requested that the absent Rodney ride all night from Dover to break the tie. After the vote in favor of independence on July 2, McKean participated in the debate over the wording of the official Declaration of Independence, which was approved on July 4.

A few days after McKean cast his vote, he left Congress to serve as colonel in command of the Fourth Battalion of the Pennsylvania Associators, a militia unit created by Benjamin Franklin in 1747. They joined General George Washington's defense of New York City at Perth Amboy, New Jersey. Being away, McKean was not available when most of the signers placed their signatures on the Declaration of Independence on August 2, 1776. Since his signature did not appear on the printed copy that was authenticated on January 17, 1777, it is assumed that he signed after that date, possibly as late as 1781.

In a conservative reaction against the advocates of American independence, the 1776-1777 Delaware General Assembly did not reelect either McKean or Rodney to the Continental Congress in October 1776. However, the British occupation after the Battle of Brandywine swung opinions enough that McKean was returned to Congress in October 1777 by the 1777–1778 Delaware General Assembly. During that time, he was constantly pursued by British forces. Over the course of the following years, he was forced to relocate his family five times.

He served continuously in the Congress until February 1, 1783. McKean helped draft the Articles of Confederation and voted for their adoption on March 1, 1781. When poor health caused Samuel Huntington to resign as president of Congress in July 1781, McKean was elected as his successor. He served from July 10 to November 4, 1781. The position was mostly ceremonial with no real authority, but the office required McKean to handle a good deal of correspondence and sign official documents. During his time in office, Lord Cornwallis's British army surrendered at Yorktown, which effectively ended the war.

Government of Delaware

Meanwhile, McKean led the effort in the General Assembly of Delaware to declare its separation from the British government, which it did on June 15, 1776. In August, he was elected to the special convention to draft a new state constitution. Upon hearing of it, McKean made the long ride to Dover, Delaware, from Philadelphia in a single day, went to a room in an inn, and that night, virtually by himself, drafted the document. It was adopted September 20, 1776. The Delaware Constitution of 1776 became the first state constitution to be produced after the Declaration of Independence.

McKean was elected to Delaware's first House of Assembly for both the 1776–1777 and the 1778–1779 sessions, succeeding John McKinly as speaker on February 12, 1777, when McKinly became president of Delaware. Shortly after President McKinly's capture and imprisonment, McKean served as the president of Delaware for a month, from September 22 to October 20, 1777. That was the time needed for the successor George Read to return from the Continental Congress in Philadelphia and to assume the duties.

Immediately after the Battle of Brandywine, the British Army occupied Wilmington and much of northern New Castle County. Its navy also controlled the lower Delaware River and Delaware Bay. As a result, the state capital, New Castle, was unsafe as a meeting place, and the Sussex County seat, Lewes, was sufficiently disrupted by Loyalists that it was unable to hold a valid general election that autumn. As president, McKean was primarily occupied with recruitment of the militia and with keeping some semblance of civic order in the portions of the state still under his control.

Government of Pennsylvania
McKean started his long tenure as chief justice of Pennsylvania on July 28, 1777, and served in that capacity until 1799. There, he largely set the rules of justice for revolutionary Pennsylvania. According to the biographer John Coleman, "only the historiographical difficulty of reviewing court records and other scattered documents prevents recognition that McKean, rather than John Marshall, did more than anyone else to establish an independent judiciary in the United States. As chief justice under a Pennsylvania constitution he considered flawed, he assumed it the right of the court to strike down legislative acts it deemed unconstitutional, preceding by ten years the U.S. Supreme Court's establishment of the doctrine of judicial review. He augmented the rights of defendants and sought penal reform, but on the other hand was slow to recognize expansion of the legal rights of women and the processes in the state's gradual elimination of slavery."

He was a member of the convention of Pennsylvania that ratified the Constitution of the United States. In the Pennsylvania State Constitutional Convention of 1789/90, he argued for a strong executive and was himself a Federalist. Nevertheless, in 1796, dissatisfied with the Federalists' domestic policies and compromises with Great Britain, he became an outspoken Jeffersonian Republican, or Democratic-Republican.

While chief justice of Pennsylvania, McKean played a role in the Whiskey Rebellion. On August 2, 1794, he took part in a conference on the rebellion. In attendance were Washington, his Cabinet, the governor of Pennsylvania, and other officials. Washington interpreted the rebellion to be a grave threat could mean "an end to our Constitution and laws." Washington advocated "the most spirited and firm measure" but held back on what that meant. McKean argued that the matter should be left up to the courts, not the military, to prosecute and punish the rebels. Alexander Hamilton insisted upon the "propriety of an immediate resort to Military force." Some weeks later, Mckean and General William Irvine wrote to Pennsylvania Governor Thomas Mifflin and discussed the mission of federal committees to negotiate with the Rebels, describing them as "well disposed." However, McKean and Irvine felt the government must suppress the insurrection to prevent it from spreading to nearby counties.

McKean was elected governor of Pennsylvania and served three terms from December 17, 1799, to December 20, 1808. In the 1799 election, he defeated the Federalist Party nominee James Ross and again more easily in the 1802 election. At first, McKean ousted Federalists from state government positions and so he has been called the father of the spoils system. However, in seeking a third term in 1805, McKean was at odds with factions of his own Democratic-Republican Party, and the Pennsylvania General Assembly instead nominated Speaker Simon Snyder for governor. McKean then forged an alliance with Federalists, called "the Quids," and defeated Snyder. Afterwards, he began removing Jeffersonians from state positions.

The governor's beliefs in stronger executive and judicial powers were bitterly denounced by the influential Aurora newspaper publisher William P. Duane and the Philadelphia populist Michael Leib. After they led public attacks calling for his impeachment, McKean filed a partially successful libel suit against Duane in 1805. The Pennsylvania House of Representatives impeached the governor in 1807, but, for the rest of his term, his friends prevented an impeachment trial from being held, and the matter was dropped. When the suit was settled after McKean left office, his son Joseph angrily criticized Duane's attorney for alleging out of context that McKean referred to the people of Pennsylvania as "clodpoles" (clodhoppers).

Some of McKean's other accomplishments included expanding free education for all and, at age eighty, leading a Philadelphia citizens group to organize a strong defense during the War of 1812. He spent his retirement in Philadelphia in writing, discussing political affairs, and enjoying the considerable wealth that he had earned through investments and real estate.

Death and legacy

McKean was a member of the Pennsylvania Society of the Cincinnati in 1785 and was subsequently its vice president. Princeton College gave him the degree of L.L.D. in 1781, Dartmouth College presented the same honor in 1782, and the University of Pennsylvania gave him the degree of A.M. in 1763 and L.L.D. in 1785. With Professor John Wilson he published "Commentaries on the Constitution of the United States" in 1790.

McKean died in Philadelphia and was buried in the First Presbyterian Church Cemetery there. In 1843, his body was moved to Laurel Hill Cemetery.

McKean County, Pennsylvania is named in his honor, as is Thomas McKean High School in New Castle County, also McKean Street in Philadelphia, and the McKean Hall dormitory at the University of Delaware. Penn State University also has a residence hall and a campus road named for him.

Oddly, the name of "Keap Street" in Brooklyn, New York, is the result of an erroneous effort to name a street after him. Many Brooklyn streets are named after signers of the Declaration of Independence, and "Keap Street" is the result of planners being unable to accurately read his signature. In some accounts the "M" of McKean was mistaken for a middle initial, and the flourish on the "n" in McKean led to the n being misread as a "p".

McKean was over six feet tall, and he typically wore a large cocked hat and carried a gold-headed cane. He was a man of quick temper and vigorous personality, "with a thin face, hawk nose and hot eyes." John Adams described him as "one of the three men in the Continental Congress who appeared to me to see more clearly to the end of the business than any others in the body." As chief justice and governor of Pennsylvania he was frequently the center of controversy.

In popular culture
In the 1969 Broadway musical, 1776, McKean is portrayed as a gun-toting cantankerous old Scot who cannot get along with the wealthy and conservative planter George Read. In truth, McKean and Read belonged to opposing political factions in Delaware, but McKean was not a Scottish immigrant. His parents were Irish Presbyterians (referred to as "Scotch-Irish" in America and "Ulster Scots" in Northern Ireland). His surname is pronounced mc-CANE but was mispronounced as mc-KEEN in the film adaptation of the musical. McKean was portrayed by Bruce MacKay in the original Broadway cast and Ray Middleton in the 1972 film version.

Almanac
Delaware elections were held October 1, and members of the General Assembly took office on October 20 or the following weekday. State Assemblymen had a one-year term. The whole General Assembly chose the Continental Congressmen for a one-year term and the State President for a three-year term. Judges of the Courts of Common Pleas were also selected by the General Assembly for the life of the person appointed. McKean served as state president only temporarily, filling the vacancy created by John McKinly's capture and resignation and awaiting the arrival of George Read.

Pennsylvania elections were held in October as well. The Pennsylvania Supreme Executive Council was created in 1776 and counsellors were popularly elected for three-year terms. A joint ballot of the Pennsylvania General Assembly and the council chose the president from among the twelve counsellors for a one-year term. The chief justice of the Pennsylvania Supreme Court was also selected by the General Assembly and Council for the life of the person appointed.

See also
 Memorial to the 56 Signers of the Declaration of Independence

References
Citations

Sources

External links

 Biographical Directory of the Governors of the United States
 Biographical Directory of the United States Congress
 Biography by Russell Pickett
 Delaware’s Governors
 The Political Graveyard
 Biography by Keith J. McLean
 Historical Society of Delaware
 National Park Service
 Pennsylvania Historical and Museum Commission
 The Thomas McKean Papers, including correspondence related to the American Revolution, are available for research use at the Historical Society of Pennsylvania.
 Delaware Historical Society; website 
 Historical Society of Pennsylvania; website
 University of Delaware; Library website

1734 births
1817 deaths
18th-century American politicians
19th-century American lawyers
American people of Scotch-Irish descent
American Presbyterians
Burials at Laurel Hill Cemetery (Philadelphia)
Continental Congressmen from Delaware
Delaware lawyers
Democratic-Republican Party state governors of the United States
Governors of Delaware
Governors of Pennsylvania
Impeached state and territorial governors of the United States
Members of the American Philosophical Society
Members of the Delaware House of Representatives
Members of the Middle Temple
Pennsylvania Democratic-Republicans
Pennsylvania Federalists
Pennsylvania lawyers
Pennsylvania militiamen in the American Revolution
People from Chester County, Pennsylvania
People from New Castle, Delaware
People from Wilmington, Delaware
People of Delaware in the American Revolution
Politicians from Philadelphia
Signers of the Articles of Confederation
Signers of the Continental Association
Signers of the United States Declaration of Independence
Speakers of the Delaware House of Representatives
Supreme Court of Pennsylvania
Founding Fathers of the United States